Edwin Disang (born 13 July 1980) is a Botswanan footballer who played as a striker. He played for the Botswana national football team between 1999 and 2001.  He currently coaches boys varsity soccer at Melbourne Central Catholic High School in Florida.  He won a regional championship there in 2013, going to the state final four.  It was recently announced that Disang will be appointed head girls varsity coach at Melbourne Central Catholic.

While playing at Grandview College his ability to read the game and pace were truly difficult for others teams to defend against him. He later became a role model for future GVC players as they follow his guidance when he joined the team as assistant coach.

"Change is good, unless it's not" -Edwin Disang

External links

Association football forwards
Botswana footballers
Botswana international footballers
1980 births
Living people
Mogoditshane Fighters players
Des Moines Menace players
USL League Two players